Heartland was an American country music band from Huntsville, Alabama. It originally consisted of Jason Albert (lead vocals), Craig Anderson (rhythm guitar), Todd Anderson (drums), Chuck Crawford (fiddle, background vocals), Mike Myerson (lead guitar), and Keith West (bass guitar, background vocals). Signed to Lofton Creek Records in 2006, the band topped the country charts that year with its debut single "I Loved Her First", also the title track to its debut album. After their next five singles failed to chart within the Top 40, all members except Albert and Crawford left, with former solo artist Chad Austin joining.

History
Heartland was founded in 1994 by Jason Albert, brothers Craig and Todd Anderson, Chuck Crawford, Mike Myerson, and Keith West. They performed at a June Jam in the state of Alabama in 1997, and began seeking a record contract through the assistance of songwriter Walt Aldridge.

Heartland signed with an independent record label called Lofton Creek Records in 2006. The group's debut single, "I Loved Her First", was released later that year, and went on to top the Billboard Hot Country Songs charts. The band's debut album, also titled I Loved Her First, was released in October 2006. Ken Burke of Country Standard Time gave the album a positive review, praising the instrumentation and Albert's "hardcore southern vocals", also saying that it had "snappy execution and catchy hooks galore."

After its second and third singles performed poorly, the band exited Lofton Creek and signed with Country Thunder Records in March 2007. They began working with producer Mark Bright, but instead released "Once a Woman Gets a Hold of Your Heart", which was co-written by John Rich of Big & Rich and Richie McDonald of Lonestar, with Rich also serving as producer. It was followed by "Slow Down", which did not chart. The label closed in March 2009. In July of the same year, the band moved to Permian Records and released the single "Mustache". Also, Myerson left the group.

By 2012, all of the original members except Albert and Crawford had left the band to start families, while Chad Austin joined. Austin had recorded two albums for Asylum Records in the late 1990s, and was later signed to Broken Bow Records. Also, Albert had been experiencing vocal issues which had to be treated with exercises and rest. To reduce the strain on his vocal cords, all three members now alternate on lead vocals. The lineup of Albert, Crawford, and Austin released a new single, "The Sound a Dream Makes", in September 2012. It was produced by James Stroud and released via his R&J Records.

Discography

Studio albums

Singles

Music videos

Nominations
Academy of Country Music
 2006 Top New Vocal Duo or Group
 2006 Single Record of the Year - "I Loved Her First"

References

Country music groups from Alabama
Lofton Creek Records artists
Musical groups established in 1994
R&J Records artists
1994 establishments in Alabama